The Serbian Hockey League Season for 1996-1997 was the sixth season of the league. Five teams participated. KHK Crvenza Zvezda won in the end. This was the first season in which HK Taš participated.

Teams
HK Partizan
KHK Crvena Zvezda
HK Vojvodina
HK Spartak Subotica
HK Taš

Regular season standings

Playoffs

Semifinals
Crvena Zvezda defeated Taš in a series. 3-7 4-2 5-0
HK Vojvodina defeated Partizan in a series. 11-3 6-5

Finals
Red Star swept Vojvodina in the finals.
Game 1 - 6-2
Game 2 - 11-6

Serbian Hockey League
Serbian Hockey League seasons
Serb